The AGO C.VIII was a German reconnaissance aircraft built by AGO Flugzeugwerke during World War I.

Design
The C.VIII was a derivative of the AGO C.IV with a Mercedes D.IVa. Only a single prototype was built.

Specifications

References

Bibliography

 

AGO C.08
Single-engined tractor aircraft
Biplanes
Military aircraft of World War I
Aircraft first flown in 1917
C.VIII